Gade v. National Solid Wastes Management Association, 505 U.S. 88 (1992), is a United States labor law case of the United States Supreme Court. The Court determined that federal Occupational Safety and Health Administration regulations preempted various Illinois provisions for licensing workers who handled hazardous waste materials.

Facts
The National Solid Wastes Management Association, a business group, sought an injunction against two Illinois statutes requiring workers get training and pass exams to handle hazardous waste. It argued these statutes were preempted by the Occupational Safety and Health Act and Occupational Safety and Health Administration regulations implementing a requirement of the Superfund Amendments and Reauthorization Act of 1986 which also standards to train workers who handle hazardous wastes. The claim was brought against petitioner Gade's predecessor as director of the state environmental protection agency.

The District Court held that the state acts were not preempted because they protected public safety and promoted job safety, but it invalidated some provisions of the acts.

The Seventh Circuit Court of Appeals affirmed in part and reversed in part, holding that the OSH Act preempts any state law that "constitutes, in a direct, clear and substantial way, regulation of worker health and safety," unless the Secretary of Labor has explicitly approved the law pursuant to § 18 of the OSH Act. In remanding, the court did not consider which, if any, of the provisions would be pre-empted.

Judgment
O'Connor J, writing for the majority, reiterated the ways in which federal law can preempt state law.

O'Connor, joined by Chief Justice Rehnquist, Justice White and Justice Scalia, concluded in Part II that the OSH Act impliedly pre-empts any state regulation of an occupational safety or health issue with respect to which a federal standard has been established, unless a state plan has been submitted and approved pursuant to § 18(b) of the Act. The Act as a whole demonstrates that Congress intended to promote occupational safety and health while avoiding subjecting workers and employers to duplicative regulation. Thus, it established a system of uniform federal standards, but gave States the option of pre-empting the federal regulations entirely pursuant to an approved state plan that displaces the federal standards. This intent is indicated principally in § 18(b)'s statement that a State "shall" submit a plan if it wishes to "assume responsibility" for developing and enforcing health and safety standards. Gade's interpretation of § 18(b)—that the Secretary's approval is required only if a State wishes to replace, not merely supplement, the federal regulations would be inconsistent with the federal scheme and is untenable in light of the surrounding provisions. The language and purposes of §§ 18(a), (c), (f), and (h) all confirm the view that the States cannot assume an enforcement role without the Secretary's approval, unless no federal standard is in effect. Also unacceptable is Gade's argument that the OSH Act does not pre-empt nonconflicting state laws because those laws, like the Act, are designed to promote worker safety. Even where such laws share a common goal, a state law will be pre-empted if it interferes with the methods by which a federal statute was intended to reach that goal. International Paper Co. v. Ouellette, 479 U.S. 481, 494, 107 S.Ct. 805, 812, 93 L.Ed.2d 883. Here, the Act does not foreclose a State from enacting its own laws, but it does restrict the ways in which it can do so. pp. 96–104.

Concurrence
Justice Kennedy concurred but thought that Congress had expressly preempted this area and that the application of implicit preemption in this case expanded the doctrine too far. Kennedy, agreeing that the state laws are pre-empted, concluded that the result is mandated by the express terms of § 18(b) of the OSH Act and that the scope of pre-emption is also defined by the statutory text. Such a finding is not contrary to the longstanding rule that this Court will not infer pre-emption of the States' historic police powers absent a clear statement of intent by Congress. Unartful though § 18(b)'s language may be, its structure and language, in conjunction with subsections (a), (c), and (f), leave little doubt that in the OSH Act Congress intended to pre-empt supplementary state regulation of an occupational safety and health issue with respect to which a federal standard exists. Pp. 109, 111-113.

Dissent
Justice Souter, writing for a four Justice minority, felt state law was not preempted. Though he agreed with Justice O'Connor that there were three categories of preemption (express, field, and conflict) he believed that congress must "unmistakably ordain" to preempt state law. He felt that state law would not interfere enough with the federal regulatory scheme to qualify as an obstacle to the full purpose and effect of federal law.

He felt the majority's strongest argument was that the regulations contained a "saving clause" which stated that any issues not spoken on were not preempted. The majority interpreted this clause to mean that Congress had assumed that issues that were spoken on were preempted. In Souter's opinion, this inference was not necessary. Finally, he stated that the requirement that state regulatory plans be submitted for approval does not indicate that an area is preempted. All that this requirement meant is that in areas which are preempted, the state must submit a plan to overcome that preemption.

See also
US labor law
 National Solid Wastes Management Association

References

Further reading

External links
 

United States Supreme Court cases
United States Supreme Court cases of the Rehnquist Court
United States federal preemption law
1992 in United States case law
Waste in the United States